Neu-Ulm (Swabian: Nej-Ulm) is the capital of the Neu-Ulm district and a town in Swabia, Bavaria. Neighbouring towns include Ulm, Senden, Pfaffenhofen an der Roth, Holzheim, Nersingen and Elchingen. The population is 58,978 (31 December 2019).

History
The modern history of Neu-Ulm began with the change of the sovereignty over the city of Ulm in 1810 from the Kingdom of Bavaria to the Kingdom of Württemberg. The Danube became the boundary between Bavaria and Württemberg. Land on the right bank of the Danube thus remained under Bavarian sovereignty. This was the beginning of Neu-Ulm's status as an independent town.

At this time Neu-Ulm was very small with little more than a few houses, taverns, pieces of land, and the village of Offenhausen. The name "Neu-Ulm" was first mentioned in records in 1814.

Upon the wishes of King Ludwig I, Neu-Ulm was included within the fort and the building work in Neu-Ulm was overseen by Major Theodor von Hildebrandt. After Neu-Ulm was connected to the railway line to Augsburg in 1853, soldiers arrived and a garrison was created there.

The city began to blossom under Mayor Josef Kollmann at the end of the 19th century. A tram line connecting Ulm and Neu-Ulm was built in 1897 and in 1900 the water tower (still a landmark today) was built, guaranteeing Neu-Ulm's water supply. In 1906, Neu-Ulm expanded beyond the city walls for the first time. The first factories were built, and it continued to expand.

After World War I, the garrison was closed. The population and wealth of the town grew, and it became a rich town. However, World War II left its mark; nearly eighty percent of the town was destroyed by Allied bombing, and all bridges across the Danube to Ulm were destroyed.

Rebuilding began, and from the end of World War II up to the 1990s, the US Army were stationed in Neu-Ulm. In 1968 the 1st Battalion, 81st Field Artillery Regiment moved from Wackernheim to Wiley Barracks. It was initially equipped with eight Pershing 1 nuclear missiles and in 1969 replaced these with 36 Pershing 1a missiles, replacing these with Pershing II missiles in 1984. The battalion was inactivated in 1986 and reformed as the 1st Battalion, 9th Field Artillery Regiment. With the ratification of the Intermediate-Range Nuclear Forces Treaty on 27 May 1988 the missiles were destroyed and the battalion was inactivated on 30 June 1991.

The departure of the US Army had a large impact on the town's economy and also left a large number of vacant army buildings.

Coat of arms
In 1857, the town was given a coat of arms, although it was not legally a city at the time. It was first granted city status by King Ludwig II in 1869. The coat of arms consists of three horizontal bands of black, white and blue, with a tower in front. The tower symbolises the fort built around Neu-Ulm, the colours black and white indicate the relationship with Ulm, and the colours white and blue show the association with Bavaria.

Districts
Neu-Ulm is arranged into 14 districts, 9 of them added between 1972 and 1977. The districts are: Burlafingen, Finningen, Gerlenhofen, Hausen, Holzschwang (including Tiefenbach), Jedelhausen, Ludwigsfeld, Neu-Ulm, Offenhausen, Pfuhl, Reutti, Schwaighofen, Steinheim and Wiley.

Politics
Neu-Ulm is currently controlled by the Christian Social Union (CSU). The mayor is Katrin Albsteiger, elected in March 2020. Her predecessor was Gerold Noerenberg, who was in office between 2004 and 2020. He had succeeded Dr Beate Merk, who had been appointed as Bavarian law minister by Edmund Stoiber on 14 October 2003.

Neu-Ulm is part of the Neu-Ulm (electoral district) for elections to the Bundestag.

The town council is arranged into four parliamentary groups with eight different parties and citizens' initiatives (the number of seats are shown in brackets):

 Christian Social Union (CSU) (16)
 Green Party (11)
 Social Democratic Party of Germany (SPD) (5)
 Free Voters' Union (FWG) (4)
 Pro Neu-Ulm (3)
 Free Democratic Party (FDP) (2)
 Young Union (2)
 The Left (Germany) (1)

Education and science
In 1994, the Neu-Ulm  (University of Applied Sciences) was founded. The  was initially located in the buildings of the former US base’s Wiley Barracks, before expanding into two floors of the newly built Edison Center and then transferring to a new, larger building on the site of the former US base in summer 2008.

Twin towns – sister cities

Neu-Ulm is twinned with:
 Bois-Colombes, a commune in the northwestern suburbs of Paris, France
 Meiningen, Thuringia, Germany
 New Ulm, Brown County, Minnesota, United States
 Trissino, in the province of Vicenza, Italy

Notable people

Otto Renner (1883–1960), botanist
Edwin Scharff (1887–1955), sculptor and professor
Hermann Köhl (1888–1938), flight pioneer
Robert Wehgartner (1909–1974), politician, president of Bayernpartei Bavaria Party (1963–1966)
Otto Haxel (1909–1998), nuclear physician
Justus Herrenberger (1920–2014), architect and professor
Willi Habermann (1922–2001), Swabian poet who belonged in his youth to the Friends of the White Rose
Alfred Hans Zoller (1928–2006), composer of church songs, organ player
Magdalena Kopp (1948–2015), terrorist and wife of terrorist Carlos the Jackal
Harald Schmidt (born 1957), actor, comedian and TV presenter
Annette Thoma (1886–1974), composer and writer
Timo Wenzel (born 1977), footballer
Anna Prohaska (born 1983), Austrian lyric soprano
Edwin Jackson (born 1983), American baseball player, Olympic silver medalist
Urs Käufer (born 1984), rower
Günay Güvenç (born 1991), Turkish footballer

Associated with the town
Theo Waigel (born 1939), former finance minister of Germany

References

External links

 
US Garrison Neu-Ulm 1951–1991

Populated places on the Danube
Neu-Ulm (district)